Pandit Jawaharlal Nehru Stadium, locally known as Fatorda Stadium, is a multi-purpose stadium situated in Margao, Goa, India. The venue has been used to host both international football as well as International cricket matches.However, after the emergence of I-League in 2007 and Indian Super League in 2014, the stadium is turned into football only stadium.

It is Goa's only international stadium and has a seating capacity of 19000 with additional 1000 in reserve. It has hosted 9 ODIs in Cricket and hosted various football tournaments including multiple Indian Super League finals and AFC Champions League. The venue was established in 1989 and is owned and operated by the Sports Authority of Goa. It is currently the home stadium of Indian Super League club FC Goa, I-League club Churchill Brothers FC Goa. In the 2020–21 Indian Super League, it was used as one of the centralized home grounds because of the COVID-19 pandemic.

History

Beginning

Jawaharlal Nehru Stadium, Fatorda was built in a record six months by the then Sports Minister Monte (D') Cruz. It was opened in 1989 as a football only stadium but in less than a year was redeveloped to include cricket. On 25 October 1989 the first cricket ODI was played between Australia and Sri Lanka in Nehru Cup.

Football clubs using the stadium

In 2006, before the 2007–08 I-League, all four Goan clubs (Dempo S.C., Churchill Brothers S.C., Salgaocar S.C., and Sporting Clube de Goa) announced that The Fatorda would be used as the home for all four teams' I-League matches. In the next season of I-League, Vasco S.C. too used the stadium as home ground. The Indian Super League club FC Goa have been tenants of the stadium since 2014.

Facilities

In 2014 it was upgraded according to the latest FIFA specifications. It is designed with a 20,000 seating capacity. The stadium complex provides two levels of fan seating arrangement along with a VIP area. Facilities include arena lighting, natural turf, broadcast room, TV studio, player dressing rooms, match delegates area, doping control rooms, medical rooms for players and spectators, VIP lounge, corporate boxes, media tribune and media working stations, press conference area, mixed zone area, CCTV cameras, a swimming pool, multipurpose gymnasium and parking facilities. It is regarded as one of the most well maintained football grounds in the Indian subcontinent.

On 1 October 2022, it was announced that India's First Hybrid Pitch will be installed in this Stadium ahead of Fifa U-17 Women's World Cup 2022.

List of centuries

Key
 * denotes that the batsman was not out.
 Inns. denotes the number of the innings in the match.
 Balls denotes the number of balls faced in an innings.
 NR denotes that the number of balls was not recorded.
 Parentheses next to the player's score denotes his century number at Edgbaston.
 The column title Date refers to the date the match started.
 The column title Result refers to the player's team result.

One Day Internationals

International cricket five-wicket hauls

Key

ODIs

Football

This venue has long been a mainstay of Indian football, having played host to many international games, including India's qualifiers for both the FIFA World Cup and AFC Asian Cup. The stadium has also been used as a home venue for the Goan clubs in AIFF competitions: Churchill Brothers S.C., Dempo S.C., FC Goa, Salgaocar S.C., Sporting Clube de Goa and Vasco S.C.

It hosted the semifinals and final of the football event during the 2014 Lusofonia Games.

The matches of 2016 BRICS U-17 Football Cup, the first edition of the tournament, were played at the stadium and Brazilian U-17 team won the trophy.

It was chosen one of the six stadiums to host the 2017 FIFA U-17 World Cup matches in India.

It has hosted the finals of Indian Super League twice in 2015 and 2020. In 2021, the stadium hosted the Group E matches of the AFC Champions League, in which FC Goa competed.

Cricket

Although the stadium was originally built to be a football venue, over the past few years it has been increasingly used to host international cricket matches. Since hosting its first ever international in 1989 between Australia and Sri Lanka, it has played host to seven further One Day Internationals, the most recent being between India and Sri Lanka in 2007. The allocation of cricket matches to the stadium has often upset the Goan football community as it renders them unable to use the venue for hosting football.

Lusofonia Games
The Stadium was renovated for the 2014 Lusofonia Games, which was conducted in Goa. The opening and closing ceremonies of these Games were held at this venue. Football matches of the Lusofonia Games were also held here.

See also
List of football stadiums in India

References

External links
Fatorda Stadium – Cricinfo

Cricket grounds in Goa
Football venues in Goa
Rugby union stadiums in India
Sports venues in Goa
Multi-purpose stadiums in India
Dempo SC
Churchill Brothers FC Goa
Salgaocar FC
Sporting Clube de Goa
Indian Super League stadiums
1989 establishments in Goa
Sports venues completed in 1989
2017 FIFA U-17 World Cup venues
Buildings and structures in Margao
20th-century architecture in India